Diconocoris is a genus of Asian lace bugs in the tribe Tingini.

Distribution and economic status
Diconocoris has been recorded from the Indian subcontinent through to Malesia.  In Vietnam, D. hewetti and D. distanti may be called bọ xít lưới, rầy chữ T or rầy thánh giá (can be translated as 'T'- or cross-bugs) and are considered a pest of black pepper.

Species
BioLib lists:
 Diconocoris capusi (Horváth, 1906)
 Diconocoris distanti Drake, 1954
 Diconocoris greeni (Kirby, 1891)
 Diconocoris hewetti (Distant, 1908)
 Diconocoris inusitatus (Drake, 1927)
 Diconocoris javanus Mayr, 1865 - type species
 Diconocoris nepalensis (Distant, 1909)

References

External Links
 Lace Bugs Database (Hemiptera: Tingidae: Diconocoris)

Tingidae
Heteroptera genera
Hemiptera of Asia